Samuel J. Foley (July 10, 1862 – June 25, 1922) was an American politician from New York.

Life
He was born on July 10, 1862, in Quebec, Canada. The family emigrated to the United States when Samuel was still a child. He attended the public schools, and the Evening High School from 1877 to 1882. In 1876, he began to work as a buyer for a dry-goods exporting firm. Later he engaged in the real estate and insurance business.

Foley was a member of the New York State Assembly in 1891, 1892 (both New York Co., 6th D.), 1893, 1894 and 1895 (all three New York Co., 5th D.). He was Minority Leader in 1895.

He was a member of the New York State Senate (12th D.) from 1896 to 1906, sitting in the 119th, 120th, 121st, 122nd, 123rd, 124th, 125th, 126th, 127th, 128th and 129th New York State Legislatures.

He died on June 25, 1922, in a sanitarium in Central Islip, Suffolk County, New York.

His son, also named Samuel J. Foley (1891–1951), was Bronx County District Attorney from to 1933 to 1950, and a Bronx County Judge from 1950 until his death.

References

1862 births
1922 deaths
Anglophone Quebec people
Democratic Party New York (state) state senators
Politicians from New York City
Democratic Party members of the New York State Assembly
Canadian emigrants to the United States